Deo Haule Filikunjombe (4 March 1972 – 15 October 2015) was a Tanzanian CCM politician and Member of Parliament for Ludewa constituency from 2010 to 2015.

He died on 15 October 2015 in a helicopter crash.

References

1972 births
2015 deaths
Chama Cha Mapinduzi MPs
Tanzanian MPs 2010–2015
Forest Hill Secondary School alumni
Moshi Police Academy alumni
Makerere University alumni
Victims of helicopter accidents or incidents
Accidental deaths in Tanzania